Michigan Bell is the subsidiary of AT&T serving the state of Michigan. Following the Bell System divestiture on January 8, 1984, the company became a subsidiary of Ameritech, the Regional Bell operating company that served the midwestern United States.  Ameritech was subsequently acquired by SBC Communications, which later changed its name to AT&T.  

Michigan Bell was one of the 22 Local Exchange Carriers that were part of the original AT&T Bell System until the 1984 divestiture, after which Michigan Bell and four other Midwestern telephone companies became part of Ameritech, the midwestern Regional Holding Company. Ameritech was one of the seven original Bell Regional Holding Companies, or "Baby Bells". By the early 1990s, Ameritech phased out state specific names such as Michigan Bell in favor of using the Ameritech name for marketing purposes. After Ameritech's acquisition by SBC Communications, the former Ameritech companies were briefly marketed as SBC Ameritech, as a transition to a unified "SBC" brand name in all 13 states in which SBC then did business. When this had been accomplished, in 2005, SBC Communications acquired AT&T. The newly merged company began marketing itself throughout the United States as the "new" AT&T. Michigan Bell is still the legal entity that provides telecommunications services in Michigan under the AT&T name. It is headquartered in Detroit.

AT&T subsidiaries
Bell System
Defunct telecommunications companies of the United States
Companies based in Detroit
American companies established in 1904
Telecommunications companies established in 1904
1904 establishments in Michigan